Ankadzor (also, Shagali-Eylar) is a town in the Lori Province of Armenia.

See also
 Lori Province

References 

Populated places in Lori Province